The 1956 Utah State Aggies football team was an American football team that represented Utah State University in the Skyline Conference during the 1956 NCAA University Division football season. In their second season under head coach Ev Faunce, the Aggies compiled a 6–4 record (4–3 against Skyline opponents), tied for third place in the Skyline Conference, and outscored opponents by a total of 221 to 199.

Schedule

References

Utah State
Utah State Aggies football seasons
Utah State Aggies football